Ice Spiders is a 2007 science fiction horror film which premiered on June 9, 2007 on the Sci Fi Channel. A team of young Winter Olympic hopefuls must slalom to safety when a hoard of giant mutated spiders spin their way out of a top secret laboratory. Ice Spiders stars Patrick Muldoon, Vanessa Estelle Williams, Noah Bastian, K. Danor Gerald and Matt Whittaker and was released on DVD in 2007.

Plot 
Dan "Dash" Dashiell (Patrick Muldoon) is a retired Olympic skier who works at a ski resort in the mountains of Utah. On a restricted side of the mountain, Dr. April Sommers (Vanessa Estelle Williams) is working on creating a new breed of spider with several others. When a group of teen skiers arrives at the mountain, Chad (Noah Bastian) challenges Dash to a race. The two show some impressive moves as the others look on. When Dash reaches a large rocky slope, he turns back and goes down another way rather than risk a leg injury like the one that ruined his career. As Dash makes it to the bottom, he meets Dr. Sommers. While they talk for a while, Frank (Stephen J. Cannell) takes the teens inside the resort. After a brief discussion, Dr. Sommers returns to the lab, where she finds dead scientists everywhere. She finds the sole survivor cocooned in a spider web. He warns Dr. Sommers about the spiders escaping and then slowly dies. When she turns to leave, the last spider remaining at the lab, a mutated Black Widow, attacks her and forces her into a locked office. She finds an alarm and engages it, which alerts Professor Marks (David Millbern) and Army Captain Baker (Thomas Calabro), who are elsewhere on the mountain, to her location.

Meanwhile, back at the lodge, Dash meets up with Ranger Rick (a pun on the children's nature magazine) who asks Dash to assist him in finding two hunters who did not return to their homes. When they find the hunters' truck parked, they dismount their snowmobiles and take a look around. Dash finds a mutilated Elk and thinks it was killed by a bear. He shoots a flare to summon Rick. When Rick arrives, they find the body of one of the hunters. When they reach a huge spider web, they find the other hunter, cocooned in the web. As they turn to run, Rick is snagged by a web and is dragged to a spider that kills him as Dash watches in horror. Dash makes it back to the hunters' truck and hot-wires it to get away.

Back at the lab, Professor Marks, Captain Baker, and a squad of soldiers enter the compound and find Dr. Sommers, who tries to warn them of the danger. Inside the lab, the spider attacks and kills a soldier. Dr. Sommers steals records of the experiment and realizes Professor Marks deliberately accelerated the spiders' growth, which makes them larger, faster, and stronger; however, it also causes them great hunger and prevents the cold from killing them. Sommers was desperate to obtain sufficient amounts spider webbing for new armor ideas. She drives back to the lodge.

When Dr. Sommers meets up with Frank and Johnny, a man comes in and screams for help. Frank and Dr. Sommers watch as the spiders kill several guests, including the teens' ski coach. After seeing several more people killed in the parking lot, Frank sees the teens hiding in a shed and leads them to a bus. Chad gets the keys and drives off, but when the black widow, which snuck onto the bus’s roof, crawls onto the windshield, Chad crashes the bus into a snow bank, causing it to fly off of the road.

Dash returns to the hotel and helps secure it. When he and Dr. Sommers search the basement, a spider gets in and almost attacks them, but they stun it with a fire extinguisher and lock it in the basement. Back in the lobby, a spider crawls in through the chimney and kills two guests before Dash impales it with the antlers of a mounted deer head.

Meanwhile, on the crashed bus, after checking the area, Frank makes sure the kids are okay. However, one of them is unconscious and injured. They think of a way to get out as the black widow tries to get in. Eventually, Franks traps the spider and the kids escape. Frank is almost killed but is rescued thanks to the timely arrival of Captain Baker and his squad.

Back at the lodge, Dash devises a plan with Captain Baker over a radio to trap the spiders. He takes his skis and leads the spiders to a snowboard half-pipe, which Baker and his men are blocking off. Johnny heads toward an avalanche cannon and waits for Dash's signal.

At the half-pipe, the spiders are captured and Dash signals Johnny, who blows the spiders up. Professor Marks, who had been opposed to killing the spiders, charges at Dash and tries to kill him. Marks falls down the side of the half-pipe to the last spider, which kills him as Baker shoots the beast.

A government agent then arrives with a group of soldiers that begin destroying all traces of the spiders. The agent demands that the survivors keep quiet about recent events and says that the "official" (that is, cover-up) explanation for what happened will be that there was a spill of hallucinogenic chemicals.

Cast 
 Patrick Muldoon as Dan 'Dash' Dashiell
 Vanessa Estelle Williams as Dr. April Sommers
 Thomas Calabro as Capt. Baker
 David Millbern as Prof. Marks
 Noah Bastian as Chad Brown
 Carleigh King as Brittany
 Stephen J. Cannell as Frank Stone
 Matt Whittaker as Steven
 Clayton Taylor as Quintin
 Charles Halford as Coach Mike
 Steve Bilich as Coach Palmer
 Kiernan Ryan Daley as Rosen (as Kiernan Daley)
 Cory McMillan as Perez (as Cory McMillian)
 Connie Young as Mrs. Stewart
 Marc Raymond as Mr. Stewart
 James C. Morris as Joseph
 Johnny Tall as Johnny
 Christopher Robin Miller as Bob (as Chris Miller)
 Paul Kiernan as Rocky
 K. Danor Gerald as Ranger Rick Dickerson
 Phil Riesen as Shadowy Man
 Kerry Pence as Panicky Tourist
 Jill Adler as Female Skier
 Amee Walden as Christina
 Angel Fisher as Cleaning Maid Gretchen

Home media 
Ice Spiders was released to DVD on October 16, 2007.

Reception
On Rotten Tomatoes the film has 2 reviews, both positive.

References

External links 
 
 
 

2007 television films
2007 films
2007 horror films
2000s science fiction horror films
American monster movies
2000s English-language films
Giant monster films
2000s monster movies
Mad scientist films
American science fiction horror films
American natural horror films
Syfy original films
Films about spiders
Films directed by Tibor Takács
2000s American films
Sony Pictures direct-to-video films